The Fiat Cronos (Type 358S) is a subcompact car released in February 2018 by the Italian automaker Fiat. It is a sedan for the Latin American market based on the Argo hatchback.

Overview
Unveiled in February 2018, the Cronos was developed as a three-box sedan version of the Argo subcompact hatchback. It takes part of the front platform, the interior, and the front doors from the Argo; altogether, about 30 percent of the components are derived from the Argo. The remaining 70 percent are specific to the Cronos, like the bonnet, front crosspieces, front and rear subframe, bumper, rear axle and skeleton of the body. During the design phase, the car was developed under the codename Type X6S. 

The Cronos was officially announced by the CEO of Fiat Chrysler Automobiles, Sergio Marchionne, in April 2016. During the announcement event, he illustrated an investment plan of $500 million for an FCA plant in Córdoba, Argentina. He anticipated total annual production of 100,000 units at full capacity. In 2018, the plant was the subject of an episode of Megafábricas from Nat Geo.

The car, which entered production in February 2018, went on sale in Brazil and Argentina that month. Within the Fiat range, in the Latin American market, it replaces three models: the Siena Fire, the Grand Siena and the Linea. Based on the new MP-S (Modular Platform Sedan) platform, it uses McPherson suspension in the front with a stabilizer bar. In the rear, a torsion beam system is adopted. 

The car has been developed by the R&D FCA Brazil center for the South American market only and is not marketed in Europe. The Cronos offers a luggage compartment with a capacity of 525 liters. The interior is shared with the Argo and uses the UConnect Touch 7" multimedia system. 

The engine range consists of the new biofuel (petrol/ ethanol) 1.3-litre 16V GSE Firefly inline-four engine capable of delivering 109 horsepower in ethanol power supply and the 1.8-litre 16V E.torQ inline four engine 139 horsepower. The 1.3-litre engine is combined with a five-speed manual gearbox or a GSR automated manual (evolution of the Dualogic) always five speed, while the 1.8-litre is combined with a five speed manual or six speed automatic Aisin AW60T.

In June 2022, Fiat announced the discontinuation of the 1.8 16v engine, which was already discontinued in Brazil since the early 2022 when the PROCONVE L7 emissions standard became mandatory.

In 2022, it is the normal Argentine car with the highest level of localization: 48% of its parts are made in the country.

As of 2022, 57% of its production is exported and over 250,000 units have been made (over 80,000 expected for 2022).

Facelift 
In late July 2022, the facelift model was released. It features an updated front grille with new Fiat badges, interior trims, a 1.0-litre petrol engine option and a CVT option.

Safety
The Cronos has front ventilated disc brakes.

The Cronos in its most basic Latin American version with 2 airbags and no ESC received 0 stars for adult occupants and 4 stars for infants from Latin NCAP in 2019.

The Cronos in its most basic Latin American version with 2 airbags, airbag switch, and no ESC received 0 stars from Latin NCAP in 2021 under its new protocol (similar to Euro NCAP 2014).

In 2022, it lost the 4-airbag option.

Sales

The Cronos was the second best-selling passenger car in Argentina in 2020, and became the best-selling passenger car in the country in 2021 and 2022.

References

External links

 

Cronos
Cars introduced in 2018
Sedans
Latin NCAP superminis
Cars of Argentina